State Highway 67 (SH 67) is a  state highway encompassing five distinct segments in south-central Colorado. SH 67's southern terminus is at SH 96 in Wetmore, and the northern terminus is at U.S. Route 85 (US 85) in Sedalia. It traverses the former route of the Florence and Cripple Creek Railroad through Phantom Canyon as a county road and carrying part of the Gold Belt Byway.

SH 67 forms the eastern border of the Mueller State Park near Divide.

Route description

SH 67 begins at its southern terminus with State Highway 96 in Wetmore, Colorado. It proceeds north into Fremont County and the city of Florence, where it is signed as Robinson Avenue to State Highway 115 (Main Street) and overlaps the highway for half a mile west before turning north again, signed as Pikes Peak Avenue. The highway crosses the Arkansas River on its way out of the city and continues northward to a junction with U.S Route 50 adjacent to Fremont County Airport.

The state portion of the highway ends at U.S. Highway 50 and becomes the county-maintained Phantom Canyon Road (CR 67 in Fremont County), carrying the Gold Belt Byway through Phantom Canyon north to Victor, where the state highway resumes, turning west and north before heading into Cripple Creek. The road turns east for a few miles before resuming its northward path, acting as the eastern border of Mueller State Park for several miles before reaching a junction with U.S. Highway 24 in Divide.

Continuing to the north-northwest, the road enters the  Pike National Forest, passing turnoffs for Red Rock Campground and the Manitou Park Recreation Area's Colorado Campground and Painted Rocks Campground before turning west and entering Douglas County, where it promptly heads into Westcreek and turns north until it reaches a junction with North Rainbow Falls Road and turns to the northwest.

In Deckers, the state portion of the road again ends to overlap County Road 126 and heads to the north-northeast signed as South Platte Canyon Road. The route takes an abrupt turn east signed as Sugar Creek Road, rejoining the larger road it split after turning north and the larger road has taken on the name Pine Creek Road. The route turns east and changes name again to Jarre Canyon Road, resume state highway status at its intersection with Rampart Range Road southwest of Sedalia.

The route leaves Pike National Forest a few miles east of resuming state highway status and continues northeast with increasing intersections as it approaches Sedalia. After crossing State Highway 105 (Perry Park Road), the route turns north and is named Manhart Street for a few blocks before reaching its northern terminus at U.S. Highway 85.

History

SH 67 is an original 1920s state highway and was originally an unbroken route.

In 1994, the route was rerouted around the Little Ike Tunnel near Cripple Creek, altering the location of the Horsethief Park Trail trailhead to the east side of the tunnel.

The Cripple Creek and Victor Gold Mining Company funded the realignment of nearly two miles of Highway 67 and built the highest bridge on the Colorado State Highway system, the Arequa Gulch Bridge, as part of its Cresson Mine expansion in 2001.

In July 2006, a flood on West Creek washed out the highway north of the town of Westcreek, closing the highway between Westcreek and Deckers to two-way traffic until reconstruction was completed. The closed segment reopened on October 27, 2006.

Major intersections

References

External links

 Colorado Routes 60-79 The Highways of Colorado

067
Transportation in Fremont County, Colorado
Transportation in Teller County, Colorado
Transportation in Douglas County, Colorado
Transportation in Jefferson County, Colorado